Coketown may refer to:
 Coketown, West Virginia
 Coketown, the fictional city in Hard Times, the Charles Dickens novel based on Preston, Lancashire during the industrial revolution.